Daffa 420 ( Article 420) is an Indian investigative dramedy television series, which premiered on 15 August 2015, on Life OK. The series is produced by Vikram Mehra of Saregama India and Mahir Khan of Mahir Films. The series written by Rajesh Beri is a police procedural based series. The series revolves around two notorious conmen, who have turned good after serving a period of their conviction term, to help a lady police officer Inspector Tanya Shivalay (Madhurima Tuli), a Delhi branch of fictional law enforcement investigative agency Central Investigation Bureau (CIB), who solves critical crime cases.

Cast 
Madhurima Tuli as CIB Officer Tanya Shivalay
 Manoj Pahwa as Chand Nawab Mohmmad
 Amit Mistry as Bhola
 Gopi Bhalla as Raj (episodic Appearance)
 Manju Brijanandan Sharma as Simran, Raj's wife (episodic appearance)
 Eijaz Khan as Eijaz Khan (Episode 9)

References

External links
 Daffa 420 on hotstar

2015 Indian television series debuts
Hindi-language television shows
Indian crime television series
Television shows set in Mumbai
Life OK original programming